Richland Township, Iowa can refer to:

 Richland Township, Adair County
 Richland Township, Carroll County
 Richland Township, Chickasaw County
 Richland Township, Decatur County
 Richland Township, Delaware County
 Richland Township, Dickinson County
 Richland Township, Franklin County
 Richland Township, Guthrie County
 Richland Township, Jackson County
 Richland Township, Jasper County
 Richland Township, Jones County
 Richland Township, Keokuk County
 Richland Township, Lyon County
 Richland Township, Mahaska County
 Richland Township, Sac County
 Richland Township, Story County
 Richland Township, Tama County
 Richland Township, Wapello County
 Richland Township, Warren County

See also
 Richland Township (disambiguation)

Iowa township disambiguation pages